Oxelösund Municipality held a municipal election on 9 September 2018 as part of the local elections. This was held on the same day as the general election.

Results
The number of seats remained at 31 with the Social Democrats winning the most at 12, a drop of one from 2014.

Constituencies
All constituencies were located in the Oxelösund urban area.

References

Oxelösund municipal elections
Oxelösund